Datuk Jimmy Wong Sze Phin is a Malaysian politician who served as the State Assistant Minister to the Chief Minister of Sabah in the Heritage Party (WARISAN) administration under former Chief Minister Shafie Apdal from May 2018 to collapse of the WARISAN administration in September 2020 and Member of the Sabah State Legislative Assembly (MLA) for Sri Tanjong also from May 2018 to September 2020. He also served as the Member of Parliament (MP) for Kota Kinabalu from May 2013 to May 2018. He was a member of the Democratic Action Party (DAP), a component party of the Pakatan Harapan (PH) opposition coalition. He served as the State Chairman of Sabah from 2013 to 2017 and a Member of Central Executive Committee (CEC) of DAP. He is also father of Justin Wong Yung Bin, the present Sri Tanjong MLA who defended the state seat on behalf of his father in the 2020 state election.

Honours 
 
  Commander of the Order of Kinabalu (PGDK) - Datuk (2018)

Election results

References

External links 
 Profile on the website of the Parliament of Malaysia

Living people
1950 births
Malaysian politicians of Chinese descent
Democratic Action Party (Malaysia) politicians
Members of the Dewan Rakyat
Members of the Sabah State Legislative Assembly
Leaders of the Opposition in the Sabah State Legislative Assembly
Sabah state ministers
Commanders of the Order of Kinabalu